Jean-Pierre-Xavier Bidauld (30 June 1743 – 1 November 1813) was a French painter, mainly of landscapes and still lifes.  Born in Carpentras, he died in Lyon.  He was the older brother, and first teacher, of Jean-Joseph-Xavier Bidauld; he was also the father-in-law of Jean-Baptiste Guimet and grandfather of Émile Étienne Guimet.

References
Biographie.net (in French)

1743 births
1813 deaths
People from Carpentras
18th-century French painters
French male painters
19th-century French painters
19th-century French male artists
18th-century French male artists